Billy Walker may refer to:

Billy Walker (footballer, born 1897) (1897–1964), English footballer of the 1920s and 1930s, later a football manager
Billy Walker (footballer, born 1879) (1879–?), English footballer
Billy Walker (boxer) (born 1939), English heavyweight boxer of the 1960s
Billy Walker (musician) (1929–2006), American country music singer and guitarist
Billy Walker (Scottish footballer) (1893–after 1925), Scottish footballer of the 1910s and 1920s
Billy Walker (Coronation Street), a fictional character in the British soap opera Coronation Street
Billy Walker (rugby union) (born 1996), English rugby tighthead prop
Billy Joe Walker Jr. (1952–2017), session guitarist and New Age musician

See also
Bill Walker (disambiguation)
William Walker (disambiguation)